Oliver Lewis Norburn (born 26 October 1992) is a professional footballer who plays as a midfielder for EFL League One club Peterborough United. Born in England, he represents the Grenada national team. He made his debut for the team in 2021 and played at the 2021 CONCACAF Gold Cup. 

In his career, he played in the English Football League for Bristol Rovers, Plymouth Argyle and Shrewsbury Town, as well as in the National League for Guiseley, Macclesfield Town and Tranmere Rovers.

Playing career
Norburn played as a youth team player with Chelsea before moving to Leicester City, where he graduated through to the professional ranks in 2011. He joined Bristol Rovers on a month-long loan deal in late September 2011, later extended to three months, where he played alongside fellow on-loan Leicester teammate Cian Bolger.

He made his debut in senior football on 14 October 2011, when he was an 86th-minute substitute for Bristol Rovers in a 5–2 victory over Rotherham United. By the end of December, Norburn return to Leicester City after his loan-spell at Bristol Rovers finish and spend the rest of the season staying at Leicester City. On 3 July Norburn signed for Bristol Rovers on a permanent basis and agreed to sign a one-year deal with the option for a further 12 months with the club. On the opening game of the season, Norburn made his debut in a 2–0 loss against Oxford United and two months later, he scored his first goal in a 3–1 win over Northampton Town. His second goal came on 5 February 2013, in a 1–1 draw against Cheltenham Town and his third was followed up a month later, in a 2–1 win over Exeter City. At the end of the 2012–13 season, Norburn was offered a new contract by the club, which he signed a one-year contract extension on 24 June 2013.

In 2013–14 season, Norburn had his first team opportunities limited, making sixteen appearances. On 4 April 2014, he left Bristol Rovers by mutual consent. First team manager Darrell Clarke said of Norburn leaving: "Ollie has left the club, and that was mutually agreed. For whatever reason it has not gone well for Ollie this season. Ollie has a chance now to try and earn himself a contract at another club, and we wish him well and thank him for his efforts."

On 23 July 2014, Norburn signed for Plymouth Argyle as a free agent on a one-year deal. He was released by Plymouth at the end of the 2014–15 season having failed to establish himself in the first team. He started training with Guiseley in late 2015 and then signed for the club after impressing manager Mark Bower in the sessions. On 27 February 2016 Norburn scored a controversial goal for Guiseley in a National League match against Braintree Town, after Braintree Town had put the ball out for a player to receive treatment. The goal stood and Guiseley drew the game 1–1.

Norburn joined Macclesfield Town of the same league in July 2016. He scored eight goals in his sole season with the Silkmen, including one in each leg of their FA Trophy semi-final win over Tranmere Rovers and one more in the 3–2 loss to York City in the final, before signing a three-year contract with Tranmere.

On 9 August 2018, after winning promotion to League Two with Tranmere via the play-offs, he signed a three-year deal to move to Shrewsbury Town, led by his former Macclesfield manager John Askey. He signed a new contract with Shrewsbury in July 2019.

On 10 August 2021, Norburn joined newly promoted EFL Championship club Peterborough United on a three-year deal for an undisclosed fee.

On 14th December 2021, Norburn was made captain of Peterborough United replacing Mark Beevers.

International career
On 9 November 2019, Norburn was called up to the Grenada national team, for which he qualifies through his paternal grandfather, for upcoming fixtures in the CONCACAF Nations League. He debuted with Grenada in a 4–0 2021 CONCACAF Gold Cup loss to Honduras on 14 July 2021.

Personal life
Norburn and his fiancée have a daughter, and a newborn son who died in September 2020.

Career statistics

Honours
Macclesfield Town
FA Trophy runner-up: 2016–17

References

External links

1992 births
Living people
Footballers from Bolton
Grenadian footballers
Grenada international footballers
English footballers
English sportspeople of Grenadian descent
Association football midfielders
Leicester City F.C. players
Bristol Rovers F.C. players
Plymouth Argyle F.C. players
English Football League players
Footballers from Leicester
Guiseley A.F.C. players
Macclesfield Town F.C. players
Tranmere Rovers F.C. players
Shrewsbury Town F.C. players
Peterborough United F.C. players
2021 CONCACAF Gold Cup players